Pond Creek is a tributary of the Ohio River,  long, in western West Virginia in the United States.

Pond Creek flows for most of its length in southern Wood County; its watershed also drains a portion of northern Jackson County.  It rises south of Rockport and flows generally west-northwestward through the unincorporated communities of Lowdell, Jerrys Run, and Flinn.  East of Flinn and again near its mouth, the creek briefly enters Jackson County.  It flows into the Ohio River on the boundary of Jackson and Wood counties, at the community of Pond Creek.

Downstream of Flinn it collects Little Pond Creek from the south.  Little Pond Creek flows in Jackson County for most of its course, northwestward through the communities of Willowdale and Topins Grove.

According to the West Virginia Department of Environmental Protection, approximately 82% of the Pond Creek watershed is forested, mostly deciduous.  Approximately 18% is used for pasture and agriculture.

See also
List of rivers of West Virginia

References 

Rivers of West Virginia
Tributaries of the Ohio River
Rivers of Wood County, West Virginia
Rivers of Jackson County, West Virginia